

Fritz Paul Heinrich Otto Klingenberg (17 December 1912 – 23 March 1945) was a German officer in the Waffen-SS who served with the SS Division Das Reich and was a commander of the SS Division Götz von Berlichingen. He was best known for his role in the capture of the Yugoslavian capital, Belgrade, for which he was awarded the Knight's Cross of the Iron Cross.

In April 1941, the German Army invaded Yugoslavia and then Greece. Klingenberg, a company commander in the Das Reich division, led his unit to the capital, Belgrade, where a small group in the vanguard accepted the surrender of the city on 13 April. A few days later, Yugoslavia surrendered.

Capture of Belgrade 
In April 1941, Klingenberg was with SS troops taking part in the invasion of Yugoslavia.  Klingenberg disobeyed orders, and decided to reconnoiter Belgrade, with his units far ahead of the main German army.  Finding a boat, he crossed the river, with the intention of ferrying a sizable force across; however, the boat sank, and he was left with just six men.  Klingenberg then encountered some Yugoslav troops who had captured a drunken German tourist, and captured them.

On the 11th April, after a number of firefights the six Germans, having sustained no casualties but capturing a number of Yugoslav soldiers, made it to the centre of Belgrade with the tourist and their prisoners.  There they raised a German flag.  The Mayor came out to meet them, after Klingenberg bluffed, telling him there was an incoming artillery barrage and an impending Luftwaffe attack.  The Mayor and some garrison troops surrendered the city to them on 12 April.

At this point a few more of Klingenberg's men arrived the same way he had, and made a show of their presence, pretending that there was more of them than there were.  The German army eventually arrived, dumbfounded at the situation, having made a complex plan to take the city that was no longer needed, and was expected to cost thousands of lives.  A few days later Yugoslavia surrendered. Klingenberg was awarded the Knight’s Cross for capturing the city, in effect capturing Belgrade with just himself, his six soldiers and the tourist.

European theatre against US forces 

On 21 December 1944, Fritz Klingenberg was promoted to SS-Standartenführer and two weeks later (on 12 January 1945) was appointed to command the SS Division Götz von Berlichingen. The division was attached to XIII SS Corps, defending southeast of Saarbrücken against the XV Corps of the Seventh United States Army. On 23 March 1945, Klingenberg was killed by a tank shell during a firefight on the western edge of Herxheim and is buried at the German War Cemetery in Andilly, France.

Decorations

 Knight's Cross of the Iron Cross on 14 May 1941 as SS-Hauptsturmführer and chief of the 2./SS-Kradschützen-Bataillon of the SS-Division "Reich".
 German Cross in Gold on 28 April 1944 as SS-Obersturmbannführer in the 2. SS-Panzer-Division "Das Reich"

References

Citations

Bibliography

 
 
 

1912 births
1945 deaths
People from Rostock (district)
SS-Standartenführer
Recipients of the Gold German Cross
Recipients of the Knight's Cross of the Iron Cross
People from the Grand Duchy of Mecklenburg-Schwerin
Waffen-SS personnel killed in action
Deaths by explosive device
Military personnel from Mecklenburg-Western Pomerania